State Highway 14 (West Bengal) is a state highway in West Bengal, India.

Route
SH 14 originates from junction with NH 14 at Dubrajpur  and passes through Ilambazar, Debipur, Kanksa, Panagarh, Mankar, Amrargar, Jamtara,  Dwariapur, Guskara, Balgona, Katwa,  Natungram, (there is no bridge across the Hooghly), Debagram, Palashi  and terminates at the junction with SH 11 at Betai (in Nadia district).

The Dubrajpur-Panagarh sector is part of Panagarh-Morgram Highway.

The total length of SH 14 is 226 km.

West Bengal Traffic Police shows the route as terminating at Betai in Nadia district, the Public Works Department shows it as terminating at Katwa in Bardhaman district.

Road sections 
It is divided into different sections as follows:

See also
List of state highways in West Bengal

References

Transport in Birbhum district
Transport in Durgapur
State Highways in West Bengal